Matthew Gregory Kuchar (born June 21, 1978) is an American professional golfer who plays on the PGA Tour and formerly the Nationwide Tour. He has won nine times on the PGA Tour.

Kuchar briefly enjoyed success in the early 2000s before suffering a slump where he struggled to maintain his playing status on the PGA Tour. He rejuvenated himself and built a new, one-plane swing from 2008 onward leading to improved results. Kuchar was the PGA Tour's leading money winner in 2010.

Kuchar won The Players Championship in 2012, the flagship event of the PGA Tour, his biggest tournament victory to date. As a result, he moved to a career high number five in the world rankings and has spent over 40 weeks ranked inside its top-10. In February 2013, Kuchar won his first World Golf Championship event, defeating Hunter Mahan in the final of the WGC-Accenture Match Play Championship.

At the 2016 Summer Olympics in Rio de Janeiro, Kuchar won the first Olympic bronze medal awarded for golf since the 1904 Summer Olympics.

Kuchar ended the 2018–19 season as the highest-earning PGA Tour player without a major championship win, with career earnings of over $50 million. The closest he has come was his second-place finish in the 2017 Open Championship at Royal Birkdale Golf Club.

Early years
Kuchar was born in Winter Park, Florida, to Peter, a life insurance salesman and college tennis pro, and Meg Kuchar, with one sibling, Rebecca. He went on to graduate from Seminole High School in Sanford in 1996. Later he attended Georgia Tech in Atlanta, where he was a two-time first-team All-American on the Yellow Jackets' golf team. After narrowly losing in the semi-finals of the 1996 U.S. Amateur championship to Tiger Woods, Kuchar won the title in 1997. He received the Haskins Award in 1998 as the nation's top collegiate golfer, and was the low amateur at both The Masters and U.S. Open. He turned pro in 2000 after earning his bachelor's degree in management. One of Kuchar's teammates at Georgia Tech was future PGA Tour professional Bryce Molder.

Professional career

Early career
Kuchar turned professional in November 2000, after working briefly for a financial services firm. He missed the sign-up deadline for the 2000 qualifying school. In 2001 he was given sponsors' exemptions to some PGA Tour tournaments, and earned enough money to be fully exempt for the 2002 season.

Kuchar's first win on the PGA Tour came at the Honda Classic in 2002. A tough year in 2005 saw him win under $403,000, 159th on the money list, which caused a loss of his tour card. He failed to regain it at qualifying school and played on the Nationwide Tour in 2006. Kuchar won its Henrico County Open and finished tenth on the Nationwide Tour money list to earn back his PGA Tour card for 2007. He retained his card for the next two seasons by finishing 115th on the money list in 2007 and 70th in 2008.

2009
Seven years after his first PGA Tour win, Kuchar won for a second time during the Fall Series in 2009 at the Turning Stone Resort Championship. He prevailed in a playoff over Vaughn Taylor that concluded on Monday due to darkness on Sunday evening.

2010
Kuchar made the Ryder Cup team in 2010, taking the eighth and last merit position on the 12-man U.S. squad on August 15. At the time, Kuchar led the PGA Tour in top-10 finishes for the year, but had not won a tournament in 2010. The winless streak ended two weeks later at The Barclays on August 29, which was played at the Ridgewood Country Club in Paramus, New Jersey; Kuchar defeated Martin Laird on the first hole of a sudden-death playoff.

Kuchar won the Vardon Trophy and Byron Nelson Award in 2010 for lowest scoring average and the PGA Tour's Arnold Palmer Award for leading the money list.

2011
Kuchar started off 2011 well with three consecutive top-10 finishes in the first three weeks of the season. He finished T6 at the opening PGA Tour event, the Hyundai Tournament of Champions on Maui. The following week at the Sony Open in Hawaii, he played his way to a T5 finish and then at the Bob Hope Classic achieved a T7 finish.

In February, Kuchar reached the semi-finals of the WGC-Accenture Match Play Championship, where he suffered a 6&5 defeat by eventual champion Luke Donald. In the 3rd place playoff match, he defeated fellow American Bubba Watson, 2&1. Previously during the week Kuchar had beaten Anders Hansen on the 22nd hole in round one, Bo Van Pelt in round two, Rickie Fowler in round three and Yang Yong-eun at the quarter-final stage.

Kuchar finished tied for second at the Memorial Tournament at Muirfield Village in June 2011 behind Steve Stricker. This was his eighth top-10 finish of the season and took him to his highest ranking to date of world number six. Kuchar finished second at The Barclays, two strokes behind the winner, Dustin Johnson. The tournament was shortened to 54 holes due to Hurricane Irene. This finish moved him to second in the FedEx Cup standings. Kuchar and Gary Woodland combined to win the Omega Mission Hills World Cup in November.

2012
Kuchar had his best performance in a major championship at The Masters when he finished in a tie for third. Kuchar was tied for the lead on the back nine on Sunday, but bogeyed the par three 16th and finished two strokes out of the playoff between  Bubba Watson and Louis Oosthuizen.

Kuchar won the biggest tournament of his career in May when he won The Players Championship at TPC Sawgrass in Ponte Vedra Beach, Florida. He shot a final round of 70 (−2) to win by two strokes over runners-up Rickie Fowler, Martin Laird, Ben Curtis, and Zach Johnson. He entered the final round in the last group, one stroke behind Kevin Na. After bogeying the first hole, he played a near-perfect round, except for a three-putt bogey on the 17th, to hold off the challengers. The win elevated Kuchar to a career high of number five in the world rankings.

2013
He won the WGC-Accenture Match Play Championship in February, defeating Hunter Mahan 2&1 in the final. During the final, Kuchar built up an early lead and was 4 up at the turn. Mahan mounted a comeback on the back nine, winning four of the next seven holes to trail by just one with two to play. Mahan's wild drive on the par-4 17th put him in trouble, and after Kuchar knocked his approach close, Mahan failed to chip in for par and conceded the hole, which ended the match and gave Kuchar his first World Golf Championship title. Throughout the week, Kuchar was never more than one down in any of his matches and only trailed three times on his way to the win. He defeated Hiroyuki Fujita, Sergio García, Nicolas Colsaerts, Robert Garrigus and Jason Day en route to the final. Kuchar moved back into the world's top 10 after this victory. His second win in 2013 came at the Memorial Tournament in early June.

Late in the year Kuchar played in two events in Australia. He finished runner-up to Adam Scott at the Australian Masters and finished fourth in the 2013 World Cup of Golf.

2014
In the final round of the Valero Texas Open in March, Kuchar held a share of the lead with nine holes to play but bogeyed the 10th and 11th holes and finished T-4. The next week, he had a four-stroke lead going into the final round at the Shell Houston Open but lost a playoff to Matt Jones' 42-yard chip-in on the first extra hole. Kuchar was again in contention the following week at the Masters Tournament, where he was tied for the lead on Sunday before four-putting the fourth hole and finishing T-5.

A week later, Kuchar won for the seventh time on the PGA Tour with a one stroke victory at the RBC Heritage. He shot a final-round 64, which included a chip-in birdie from a greenside bunker on the 18th hole to come from four shots behind and claim victory.

2015

At the Sony Open in Hawaii in January, Kuchar opened with 65–63 to lead after two rounds. He stalled on the weekend, however, to finish tied for third. In the final round Kuchar failed to make a birdie, snapping his streak of 255 rounds on the PGA Tour with at least one birdie. The following week Kuchar tied for second, one stroke behind the winner, at the Humana Challenge.

In April, Kuchar contended at the RBC Heritage and finished in fifth place. His best performance in the season's majors came in August at the PGA Championship at Whistling Straits in Wisconsin where he finished tied for seventh.

Kuchar played in only two official events outside of the PGA Tour in 2015 but did very well in both. He finished one stroke back to fellow American Rickie Fowler at the Scottish Open and won the Fiji International, an official event on the PGA Tour of Australasia.

Kuchar had seven top-tens for the season but did not win a PGA Tour tournament for the first time in four years. He finished well down the money list after finishing in the top 10 in earnings in four of the preceding five seasons.

2016
Kuchar had 9 top-10s heading into the 2016 Summer Olympics, and continued his good run with a bronze medal after a final round 63.

2017
In the 2017 season, Kuchar competed in 26 events on the PGA Tour, making the cut in 22, including nine top-10 finishes. He finished tied for fourth at the Masters, his fourth top-10 finish in that event. At the Open Championship, Kuchar shared the first-round lead with Brooks Koepka and Jordan Spieth and finished rounds two and three in solo second behind Spieth. After Spieth's near meltdown on the 13th hole of the final round, Kuchar held a one-stroke lead with five holes to play. However, Spieth played the last five holes in five-under-par to claim the championship by three strokes over Kuchar, who finished three strokes ahead of third-place finisher Li Haotong. Kuchar finished the year 14th in the FedEx Cup standings and represented the United States in the President's Cup, posting a 2–1 record in the United States' win.

2018
In the 2017–18 PGA Tour season, Kuchar had another winless campaign. He played in 24 events. He had four top-10 finishes and made 20 cuts. He won $1,720,097 for the year and finished 76th in the season long FedEx Cup.

U.S. Ryder Cup captain Jim Furyk named Kuchar as a non-playing vice-captain for the U.S. team in the 2018 Ryder Cup. The U.S. team lost to the European team 17 1/2 to 10 1/2 at Le Golf National outside of Paris, France.

On November 11, 2018, Kuchar won the Mayakoba Golf Classic in Cancun, Mexico. This event was part of the 2018–19 PGA Tour season. Kuchar took home a winner's check of $1.296 million and paid his caddie, David Giral Ortiz, the amount they agreed to for a top ten finish ($4,000) and an additional $1,000 on top of that to equal $5,000, which is a 0.38 percent tip of the $1.296 million, causing a social media controversy. This amount is below the average payout (10 percent) for a full-time caddie whose player wins. Because Kuchar's regular caddie was not available, Ortiz was hired and agreed to the terms presented.  Ortiz has stated to Golf.com that he never expected the full 10 percent payout and that "Matt is a good person and a great player. He treated me very well. I am only disappointed by how it all finished." When asked about giving his caddie such a low tip, Kuchar defended his decision by stating, "For a guy who makes 200 a day, a 5000 dollar week is a really big week". On February 15, 2019, Kuchar apologized and agreed to pay Ortiz the requested $50,000 and also donate an unspecified amount to local Cancun charities.

At the end of the 2018–19 PGA Tour regular season, Rory McIlroy jokingly roasted Matt Kuchar over the caddie pay controversy. At the initial award ceremony of the Wyndham Rewards Top 10, which awarded a $10 million bonus pool to the top 10 players in the final regular season FedEx Cup standings, after Kuchar playfully joked about McIlroy's narrow 2-point margin for  an extra $300,000, McIlroy highlighted that "And we all know what money means to him."

2019
On January 13, 2019, Kuchar won the Sony Open in Hawaii, his second win in three starts.

On March 31, 2019, Kuchar reached the championship round of the WGC-Dell Technologies Match Play for the second time in his career, having previously done so in 2013 when he went on to win the title. He lost to Kevin Kisner, 3 & 2, in the final.

In December 2019, Kuchar played on the U.S. team at the 2019 Presidents Cup at Royal Melbourne Golf Club in Australia. The U.S. team won 16–14. Kuchar went 0–1–3, but battled back from 3 down against Louis Oosthuizen to halve the match in Sunday singles. Kuchar made the Cup-clinching putt on 17.

2020
On January 19, 2020, Kuchar won the Singapore Open on the Japan Golf Tour. The tournament was co-sanctioned by the Asian Tour.

Personal life
Kuchar is married to Sybi Parker, who was a tennis player at Georgia Tech, and they live on St. Simons Island in Georgia. Their two sons are Cameron Cole and Carson Wright. Kuchar is a Christian.

Amateur wins
1997 Terra Cotta Invitational, U.S. Amateur

Professional wins (18)

PGA Tour wins (9)

PGA Tour playoff record (2–1)

Japan Golf Tour wins (1)

1Co-sanctioned by the Asian Tour

PGA Tour of Australasia wins (1)

1Co-sanctioned by the OneAsia Tour

Nationwide Tour wins (1)

Nationwide Tour playoff record (1–0)

Other wins (6)

Results in major championships
Results not in chronological order in 2020.

LA = Low amateur
CUT = missed the half-way cut
"T" = tied
NT = No tournament due to COVID-19 pandemic

Summary

Most consecutive cuts made – 14 (2013 Masters – 2016 Open Championship)
Longest streak of top-10s – 2 (2017 Open Championship – 2017 PGA)

The Players Championship

Wins (1)

Results timeline

CUT = missed the halfway cut
WD = withdrew
"T" indicates a tie for a place
C = Canceled after the first round due to the COVID-19 pandemic

World Golf Championships

Wins (1)

Results timeline
Results not in chronological order before 2015.

1Cancelled due to COVID-19 pandemic

QF, R16, R32, R64 = Round in which player lost in match play
NT = no tournament
"T" = tied
Note that the HSBC Champions did not become a WGC event until 2009.

PGA Tour career summary

* As of April 17, 2022

U.S. national team appearances
Amateur
Eisenhower Trophy: 1998
Palmer Cup: 1998 (tie), 1999 (winners)
Walker Cup: 1999

Professional
Ryder Cup: 2010, 2012, 2014, 2016 (winners)
Presidents Cup: 2011 (winners), 2013 (winners), 2015 (winners), 2017 (winners), 2019 (winners)
World Cup: 2011 (winners), 2013, 2018

See also
2006 Nationwide Tour graduates

References

External links

American male golfers
Georgia Tech Yellow Jackets men's golfers
PGA Tour golfers
Ryder Cup competitors for the United States
Golfers at the 2016 Summer Olympics
Medalists at the 2016 Summer Olympics
Olympic bronze medalists for the United States in golf
Korn Ferry Tour graduates
Golfers from Florida
Golfers from Georgia (U.S. state)
American people of Ukrainian descent
Sportspeople from Winter Park, Florida
People from Glynn County, Georgia
1978 births
Living people